In Living Cover is the second studio album by American singer-songwriter Jay Brannan, released in the United States on June 23, 2009. The album features seven cover songs and two originals. The album reached number ten on the Billboard Top Heatseekers chart for the week of July 25, 2009. Allmusic critic Andrew Leahey gave the album a mixed rating, stating the album's "highlights spread too thinly to do much good" and PopMatters critic Jer Fairall called the album a "satisfying collection" with "a couple of bum notes".

Track listing
 "Beautifully" (Jay Brannan) - 3:14
 "Say It's Possible" (Terra Naomi) - 3:25
 "All I Want" (Joni Mitchell) - 4:06
 "Blowin' in the Wind" (Bob Dylan) - 2:02
 "The Freshmen" (The Verve Pipe) - 4:16
 "Good Mother" (Jann Arden) - 3:10
 "Both Hands" (Ani Difranco) - 1:27
 "Zombie" (The Cranberries) - 3:12
 "Drowning" (Jay Brannan) - 4:25

Personnel
 Jay Brannan - singing, guitar, bass, kashaka, and piano (except "drowning")
 Greg Heffernan - cello
 Scott Starrett - piano arrangement for "Drowning"
 Drew Brody - production, mixing, and recording
 Mark Chalecki - mastering 
 Pedro Fanti and Beatriz Milhomem - album artwork
 M. Clark - photography

References

External links

2009 albums
Jay Brannan albums